Nexxus Band is a Filipino pop rock band formed in 1991. They are best known for the song "I'll Never Go", the group's first single from their debut album Pictures In My Mind, released in 1994. They received a lot of airplay during the mid-'90s. They received an Awit Award in the category 'Best Pop Recording' given by the Philippine Association of The Record Industry (PARI) for "I'll Never Go". The band is composed of Pett del Rosario and Deck Pagsangjan on vocals, Erwin dela Cruz on keyboards, Jerwin Galarion on bass, Mike Motos on drums and Frank Singcol on guitar. The band received their very first Gold record award for their album "Pictures in my Mind". The album includes "How Can I Forget You", "Kaibigan Mo", "Don't Give Up for Love", "Walang Hanggan", "Tagumpay", and "Kung Ako'y Uuwi". Most of the songs of Nexxus were written and arranged by Pett del Rosario, Frank Singcol, and Erwin dela Cruz.

In March 1998, the band released their 2nd album "I Keep On Saying". with their carrier single "I Keep On Saying" zoomed to the top of the radio charts and will perform at Calzada, Davao City at April 1–15.

The 2nd Generation members are Jason Singcol on Vocals, Mac De Castro on Keyboards, Mhike De Castro on Drums and Malvin Atilon on Bass.

"I'll Never Go" was covered in 2005 by Erik Santos which was the theme song of Stained Glass followed by the box office hit movie in 2007 One More Chance and from his album Loving You Now.  The song I'll Never Go was also covered by American Pop singer David Archuleta from his very 1st Filipino Album Forevermore in 2012.

References 

 Nexxus - Pictures in My Mind Album Review

External links 
 Philippine Music Registry - Nexxus
 Performers Right Society of the Philippines - Nexxus

Musical groups established in 1991
Filipino pop music groups
Filipino rock music groups
Musical quintets
1991 establishments in the Philippines